The 1925 Birthday Honours were appointments by King George V to various orders and honours to reward and highlight good works by citizens of the British Empire. The appointments were made to celebrate the official birthday of The King, and were published in The London Gazette on 3 June 1925.

The recipients of honours are displayed here as they were styled before their new honour, and arranged by honour, with classes (Knight, Knight Grand Cross, etc.) and then divisions (Military, Civil, etc.) as appropriate,

United Kingdom and British Empire

Viscount
Marcus Samuel, Baron Bearsted

Privy Councillor
The King appointed the following to His Majesty's Most Honourable Privy Council:

Colonel William Graham Nicholson  Member of Parliament for the Petersfield Division since 1897. Chairman of the Selection Committee of the House of Commons and of the Chairman's Panel

Baronetcies
Lieutenant-Colonel George Loyd Courthope  Member of Parliament for the Rye Division of Sussex since 1906. For political and public services.
Sir John Ritchie Findlay  Chairman of the Board of Trustees, for the National Gallery in Scotland. Former Master of the Merchant Company of Edinburgh. Chairman of Sick Children's Hospital, Edinburgh. For political and public services in Scotland.
Hugo Hirst, Chairman of General Electric Company Limited. Member of Board of Trade Advisory Council
Lieutenant-Colonel James Lithgow  President of the National Confederation of Employers Organisations. British-Employers Delegate at the International Labour Conference at Geneva 1922-25
Major Sir David Hughes-Morgan  High Sheriff of Breconshire 1898–99. Has been several times Mayor of Tenby. For political and public services in Wales. 
Sir John Bland-Sutton  President of the Royal College of Surgeons
Wilfrid Forbes Home Thomson, For political and public services in Yorkshire.
Major Granville Charles Hastings Wheler  Member of Parliament for Faversham Division since 1910. For political and public services.

Knight Bachelor

Major-General Llewellyn William Atcherley  H.M. Inspector of Constabulary
Major Richard Whieldon Barnett  Member of Parliament for West St. Pancras, October 1916–18, and for S.W. St. Pancras since 1918. For political and public services.
James Berry  Consulting Surgeon to the Royal Free Hospital. Member of the Council of the Royal College of Surgeons of England. Chief authority on goitre in this country.
Herbert Edwin Blain  Principal Agent of the Conservative and Unionist Party since 1924. Late Assistant Managing Director of the London Underground Railways and the London General Omnibus Company Group For political and public services.
William James Miller Burton. For public, services in connection with the new site and building of Lloyds. Managing Director of the City of London Real Property Co. Ltd.
John Byford  For political and public services in West Ham. Former Mayor of West Ham
Harry Edward Dixey  Chairman and Honorary Secretary of the Bewdley and West Worcestershire Unionist Association for 25 years. For political and public services.
David William Evans, Director and Legal Adviser of the Welsh National Memorial Association. For public services.
in Wales
Alderman John William Forrest  Member of Blackburn Town Council since 1913. Alderman 1921. Leader of the Council since 1916. Chairman of the Finance Committee and of the Education Committee. For political and public services.
Major Ernest Gray  Member of Parliament for West Ham (North) 1895-1906 for Accrington 1918–1922, Member of the London County Council since 1907, of which he was Vice-Chairman in 1915. Formerly President of the National Union of Teachers. For political and public services.
Herbert Hamilton Harty, Composer; Conductor of the Hallé Orchestra
Herbert James Hope, Senior Registrar, Bankruptcy and Companies Winding-up Department
Travers Humphreys, Senior Prosecuting Counsel for the Treasury
John Herbert Hunter  Chairman of the London County Council, of which he has been a member since 1907. Chairman of the North Paddington Conservative Association since 1907. For political and public services.
Barry Vincent Jackson, Manager of the Birmingham Repertory Theatre
Alderman Percy Richard Jackson, Chairman of Education Committee of West Riding of Yorkshire. For honorary services to education.
John William Lorden  Member of Parliament for North St. Pancras 1918–23. Member of Wandsworth Borough Council for 21 years, Mayor 1903-4 and 1907–8. Chairman of Committees on Stone, Brick and Clay Ware Trades and on Timber set up in 1920-21 under the Profiteering Act. For political and public services.
William John Morcom  For political and public services in Surrey
George Herbert Oatley, Architect of Bristol University. For public services.
Bernard Partridge, Artist
John Robertson  Medical Officer of Health, Birmingham. Professor of Public Health in Birmingham University
Jonah Walker-Smith, Director of Housing, Ministry of Health
Philip Colville Smith  Grand Secretary of the United Grand Lodge of English Freemasons
Thomas Taylor, For political and public services in Macclesfield.
Alderman Illtyd Thomas  Former Lord Mayor of Cardiff. Original Member of the Court of Governors and of the Council of the National Museum of Wales. Honorary Treasurer since 1917. For political and public services in Wales.

British India
Clement Daniel Maggs Hindley  Chief Commissioner for Railways
Chunilal Vijbhukhandas Mehta, Member of the Executive Council, Bombay
Major-General William Bernard James  Director of Remounts
Selwyn Howe Fremantle  Member, Board of Revenue, United Provinces
James MacKenna  Indian Civil Service, Additional Financial Commissioner, Burma
John Hope Simpson  Indian Civil Service (retired), late Chairman, Colonies Committee
Rajamantra Dhurina Albion Rajkumar Banerji  Indian Civil Service (retired), Dewan and President in Council, Mysore
Lieutenant-Colonel William Frederick Travers O'Connor  late British Envoy at the Court of Nepal
Lieutenant-Colonel Robert William Layard Dunlop  Solicitor to the Government of India
Diwan Bahadur Rajasabhabhusana Krishnarajapuram Pallegondai Puttanna Chetty  Member of the Legislative Council, Mysore, Mysore Civil Service (retired)
Raja Venganad Vasudeva Raja Avargal, Valiya Nambidi  of Kollengode, Landholder, Malabar, Madras
Leslie Sewell Hudson, Member of the Legislative Council, Bombay, Partner in firm of Messrs. Mackinnon, Mackenzie & Co., President, Bombay Chamber of Commerce, and Member of Bombay Port Trust 
Hubert Winch Carr, Partner, Balmer, Lawrie & Co., President, European Association, Bengal
Charles Ross Alston, Barrister-at-Law, Allahabad, United Provinces
Vasantrao Anandrao Dabholkar  Member of the Legislative Council, Bombay, Landowner, Bombay
D'Arcy Lindsay  Member, Legislative Assembly
John Campbell  Indian Civil Service (retired), Representative of the Government of India on the League of Nations Opium Advisory Committee

Colonies, Protectorates, etc.
Aaron Turner Banks, President of the Melbourne Hospital, State of Victoria
The Hon. John Henry Hosking  lately Judge of the Supreme Court of New Zealand
Joseph Clifton Love, lately President of the Associated Chambers of Manufactures of the Australian Chamber of Commerce, Commonwealth of Australia, in recognition of his services to the Commonwealth
Lieutenant-Colonel Harry Claude Moorhouse  Lieutenant-Governor of the Southern Provinces of Nigeria
James Peiris, Vice-President of the Legislative Council of Ceylon
Archibald Thomas Strong, formerly Professor of Classics and Lecturer in English at Melbourne University, and Chief Government Censor of Cinematograph Films, Commonwealth of Australia
George O'Donnell Walton, Chief Justice of Grenada

The Most Honourable Order of the Bath

Knight Grand Cross of the Order of the Bath (GCB)

Military Division
Royal Navy
Admiral Sir William Christopher Pakenham

Civil Division

Knight Commander of the Order of the Bath (KCB)

Military Division
Royal Navy
Vice-Admiral Sir James Andrew Fergusson 
Vice-Admiral Michael Henry Hodges 

Army
Major-General Sir Hew Dalrymple Fanshawe  Colonel, The Queen's Bays (2nd Dragoon Guards) 
Major-General Samuel Guise-Moores  late Royal Army Medical Corps, 
Major-General Charles William Grant Richardson  Indian Army, General Officer Commanding, Poona District, India

Civil Division
The Right Reverend Bishop John Taylor Smith  late Chaplain-General to the Forces

Companion of the Order of the Bath (CB)

Military Division
Royal Navy
Surgeon Rear-Admiral Alexander Maclean 
Engineer Rear-Admiral Herbert Brooks Moorshead 
Captain the Hon. Herbert Meade 
Captain Joseph Charles Walrond Henley  
Colonel Joseph Arthur Myles Ariel Clark 
Captain William Marshall 

Army
Major General Claude Douglas Hamilton Moore  Half-Pay List
Colonel George Walker  Chief Engineer, Eastern Command
Colonel Arthur Mudge  Inspector of the West Indian Local Forces, and Officer Commanding the Troops, Jamaica
Colonel Harry George Burrard  Assistant Director of Supplies and Transport, Egypt
Colonel Barnett Dyer Lempriere Gray Anley  Commandant, Senior Officers School, Sheerness
Colonel Philip Lancelot Holbrooke  Colonel Royal Artillery, Attached to the Staff, Headquarters, Scottish Command
Colonel Hubert Jervoise Huddleston  General Officer Commanding, Sudan
Major-General Henry Edward ap Rhys Pryce  Indian Army, Director of Supplies and Transport, India
Colonel Herbert William Jackson  Indian Army, Area Commandant, Bangalore Brigade Area, India
Colonel Patrick Henry Dundas  Indian Army, Brigade Commander, 18th Indian Infantry Brigade, India

Civil Division

Charles Frederick Munday, Deputy Director of Naval Construction, Admiralty
Colonel Harry Dalton Henderson  Territorial Army, Honorary Colonel, 51st (Highland) Divisional Train, Royal Army Service Corps, Territorial Army
Group Captain John Adrian Chamier 
Horace Christian Dawkins  Clerk Assistant of the House of Commons
Francis Netherwood Dixon, Secretary, Exchequer and Audit Department
Edward Vandermere Fleming, Director of Establishments, War Office
John Duncan Gregory  Assistant Under Secretary of State, Foreign Office
Percy Jesse Gowlett Rose, Assistant Under Secretary for Scotland
Frederick William Leith-Ross, Deputy Controller of Finance, Treasury. Until recently British Member of Finance Board of Reparations Commission
Charles Gordon Spry, Commissioner and Joint Secretary, Board of Inland Revenue
Sylvanus Percival Vivian, Registrar General 
Humbert Wolfe  Principal Assistant Secretary, Ministry of Labour

The Most Exalted Order of the Star of India

Knight Grand Commander (GCSI)

The Rt. Hon. Victor Alexander George Robert, Earl of Lytton  Viceroy and Acting Governor-General of India

Knight Commander (KCSI)
Major His Highness Raj Rajeshwar Maharajadhiraja Umaid Singh Bahadur  Maharaja of Jodhpur, Rajputana
Sir Alexander Frederick Whyte, President, Legislative Assembly
Sir Maurice Henry Weston Hayward, Indian Civil Service, Member of the Executive Council, Bombay
Sir Abdur Rahim, Member of the Executive Council, Bengal

Companion (CSI)
Major-General Thomas Henry Symons  Indian Medical Service, Honorary Surgeon to His Majesty the King, Surgeon-General with the Government of Madras
Frederick Lewisohn  Indian Civil Service, Chief Secretary to the Government of Burma
William Peter Sangster  Chief Engineer, Irrigation Branch, Public Works Department, Punjab

The Most Distinguished Order of Saint Michael and Saint George

Knight Grand Cross of the Order of St Michael and St George (GCMG)
The Rt. Hon. Sir John Lawrence Baird  Governor-General and Commander-in-Chief designate of the Commonwealth of Australia
Sir William George Tyrrell  Permanent Under Secretary of State, Foreign Office

Knight Commander of the Order of St Michael and St George (KCMG)
Sir Charles Calvert Bowring  Governor and Commander-in-Chief, Nyasaland Protectorate
Sir Henry Robert Conway Dobbs  High Commissioner and Commander-in-Chief, Iraq
Colonel Gerald Henry Summers  Governor and Commander-in-Chief, Somaliland Protectorate
The Hon. Sir Robert Furse McMillan  Lieutenant-Governor and Chief Justice of the Supreme Court, State of Western Australia
Sir Alexander Wood Renton  formerly Chief Justice of the Island of Ceylon; Chairman, Compensation (Ireland) Commission
John Charles Tudor Vaughan  His Majesty's Envoy Extraordinary and Minister Plenipotentiary to the Republics of Estonia, Latvia, and Lithuania
Sir Percy Lyham Loraine  His Majesty's Envoy Extraordinary and Minister Plenipotentiary to His Majesty the Shah of Persia

Companion of the Order of St Michael and St George (CMG)
Edward Bruce Alexander, Controller of Revenue, Ceylon
Frank Morrish Baddeley, Chief Secretary to the Government of Nigeria, lately Under Secretary, Straits Settlements
Albert Cecil Day  Official Secretary to the Governor-General, Dominion of New Zealand
Jules Ellenberger  Resident Commissioner, Bechuanaland Protectorate
Reginald Clifton Grannum, Treasurer, Colony of Kenya
The Most Reverend Edward Hutson  Bishop of Antigua and Archbishop of the Province of the West Indies, Chairman of the Central Relief Committee in the Leeward Islands after the recent hurricane
William Mclver, Director of Land Settlement, Secretary for Lands, Chairman of Closer Settlement Board and Member of Board of Land and Works, State of Victoria
John Henry Starling  Official Secretary to the Governor-General and Secretary of the Federal Executive Council, Commonwealth of Australia 
Oswald Francis Gerard Stonor, British Resident, Selangor, Federated Malay States
Charles John Howell Thomas, Chief Valuer, Board of Inland Revenue; for services as Member of the Compensation (Ireland) Commission
Ernest Frederick Gye, Counsellor in the Foreign Office
John Murray, Counsellor in the Foreign Office
John Joyce Broderick, Commercial Counsellor at His Majesty's Embassy at Washington
Arthur Andrew Morrison  British Delegate on the International Maritime Sanitary and Quarantine Board of Egypt
Godfrey Thomas Havard, Oriental Secretary to his Majesty's Legation at Tehran

Honorary Companions
Raja Chulan ibni Sultan Abdullah, the Rajadi-Hilir of Perak, Federated Malay States
Khan Bahadur Sayed Hussain bin Hamid al Mehdar, Chief Minister of the Kaiti Sultans of Mokalla, Aden Protectorate

The Most Eminent Order of the Indian Empire

Knight Commander (KCIE)

Chetput Pattabhirama Ayyar Ramaswami Ayyar Avargal  Member of the Executive Council, Madras
Samuel Perry O'Donnell  Indian Civil Service, Member of the Executive Council, United Provinces
Bertram Prior Standen  Indian Civil Service, Member of the Executive Council, Central Provinces
Denys de Saumarez Bray  Foreign Secretary to the Government of India

Companion (CIE)
Rao Bahadur Dhau Bakshi Raghubir Singh, President, Bharatpur State Council, Rajputana
Khan Bahadur Kaus Rustomji, Finance and Home Member, State Council, Bikaner, Rajputana
Lieutenant-Colonel Roger Parker Wilson, Indian Medical Service, Officiating Surgeon-General to the Government of Bengal
George Arthur Thomas, Indian Civil Service, Secretary to the Government of Bombay, Revenue Department
Henry Tireman, Chief Conservator of Forests, Madras
Arthur Durham Ashdown, Inspector-General of Police, United Provinces
Thomas Henry Morony, Inspector-General of Police, Central Provinces
Cyril Walter Lloyd Jones, Agent and Chief Engineer, His Exalted Highness the Nizam's Guaranteed State Railways Company, Hyderabad, Deccan
Henry Arthur Crouch, Consulting Architect to the Government of Bengal
William Gaskell, Indian Civil Service, Income-Tax Commissioner and Opium Agent, United Provinces
Douglas Gordon Harris, Deputy Secretary to the Government of India, Department of Industries and Labour
Lieutenant-Colonel Clayton Alexander Francis Hingston  Indian Medical Service, Superintendent, Government Hospital for Women and Children, Madras
Raymond Patrick Hadow, Superintending Engineer, Irrigation Branch, Public Works Department, Punjab
Lieutenant-Colonel Walter Dorling Smiles  Member of the Legislative Council, Assam, General Manager, Moran Tea Company
Joseph Miles Clay  Indian Civil Service, Magistrate and Collector, United Provinces
Major John Aloysius Brett, Political Agent, Khyber, North-West Frontier Province
Major Henry Bundle Lawrence, Political Agent, Haraoti and Tonk, Bajputana
Archibald Morven MacMillan, Indian Civil Service, Collector and District Magistrate and Political Agent, Surat, Bombay
Khan Bahadur Qazi Aziz-ud-Din Ahmad  late Deputy Collector, United Provinces, Diwan of Datia State, Central India
Oscar de Glanville  Member of the Legislative Council, Burma, Governing Director, Rangoon Daily News
Khan Bahadur Nawabzada Sayyid Ashraf-ud-Din Ahmad, Member of the Legislative Council, Bihar and Orissa, Vice-President, Provincial Haj Committee
Khan Bahadur Behramji Hormasji Nanavati, Medical Practitioner, Ahmedabad, Bombay
Surendra Nath Mullick, Pleader, Alipore Court, Bengal

The Royal Victorian Order

Knight Grand Cross of the Royal Victorian Order (GCVO)
Hugh Cecil, Earl of Lonsdale
William Henry, Baron Desborough

Knight Commander of the Royal Victorian Order (KCVO)
The Right Rev. Hubert Murray Burge, Lord Bishop of Oxford
Bernard Edward Halsey Bircham
Joseph Henry Greer

Commander of the Royal Victorian Order (CVO)
Major the Hon. Richard Frederick Molyneux 
Colonel St. John Corbet Gore 
Colonel Bernard William Lynedoch McMahon

Member of the Royal Victorian Order, 4th class (MVO)
Captain the Hon. Alexander Henry Louis Hardinge 
Lieutenant-Commander Ronald George Bowes-Lyon  (dated 16 February 1925)
Captain Albert John Robertson  
Major Trevor Newall Watson

Member of the Royal Victorian Order, 5th class (MVO)
The Reverend Albert Lee Richard Marsh

The Most Excellent Order of the British Empire

Knight Grand Cross of the Order of the British Empire (GBE)

Military Division

Civil Division

Major-General Herbert Francis Eaton, Baron Cheylesmore  Chairman of the National Rifle Association; President of the Lord Roberts Memorial Workshops. Twice Mayor of Westminster and Chairman of London County Council 1912-13
Sir Frederic George Kenyon  Director and Principal Librarian of the British Museum
Sir John Francis Cleverton Snell  Chairman of the Electricity Commission

Colonies, Protectorates, etc.
Sir Hugh Charles Clifford  Governor and Commander-in-Chief of the Colony and Protectorate of Nigeria, Governor and Commander-in-Chief designate of the Island of Ceylon

Dame Commander of the Order of the British Empire (DBE)

Marie-Louise Emma Cécile Gye (Madame Albani)
Susan Mary Elizabeth, Lady St. Helier  a Member of the London County Council for 15 years, has taken an active part in social and philanthropic work. For public services.
Louisa Innes Lumsden  late Headmistress of St. Leonards School for Girls and First Warden of University Hall for Women, St. Andrews
Anne Beadsmore Smith  Matron-in-Chief, Queen Alexandra's Imperial Military Nursing Service, 1919–24
Mary Monica Cunliffe Wills, Lady of Grace of the Order of St. John of Jerusalem. For public services.

Colonies, Protectorates, etc.
Mary, Lady Cook. In recognition of her services in connection with visitors to London from the Commonwealth of Australia.

Knight Commander of the Order of the British Empire (KBE)

Military Division
Royal Navy
Vice-Admiral Frederick Charles Learmonth 

Army
Major-General George Norton Cory  Deputy Chief of the General Staff, Army Headquarters, India
Major-General Cecil Francis Romer  Director of Staff Duties, War Office

Royal Air Force
Air Vice-Marshal John Frederick Andrews Higgins

Civil Division

Edward Hall Alderson  Clerk Assistant of Parliaments
Major Robert Lister Bower  Chief Constable of North Riding of Yorkshire
Edmund Kerchever Chambers  Second Secretary, Board of Education
Colonel Charles Clifford  For political and public services in Sheffield
John Smith Flett  Director of Geological Survey of Great Britain and Museum of Practical Geology
Charles Leolin Forestier-Walker  |Knight of Grace of the Order of St. John of Jerusalem. For political and public services. Member of Parliament for Monmouth. since 1918. Chairman of Monmouthshire County Council 1923–24. A Forestry Commissioner (unpaid). A Commissioner of the Board of Control (unpaid). A Welsh Church Commissioner (unpaid)
Frederick Thomas Hopkinson  For services in connection with the Nile Dam, Sudan
Charles Fraser Adair Hore  Principal Assistant Secretary, Ministry of Pensions
Francis Adolphus Jones  Legal Adviser, Ministry of Agriculture and Fisheries and Solicitor to Commissioners of Crown Lands
Frederick Sydney Parry  Deputy Chairman, Board of Customs and Excise
Henry Arthur Payne  Second Secretary, Board of Trade
Sir John Reid  Director of Glasgow Chamber of Commerce, Director of Glasgow Infirmary, Vice-President of the Princess Louise Scottish Hospital for Limbless Sailors and Soldiers, President of the Glasgow YMCA For political and public services.
John Lloyd Vaughan Seymour Williams , Lieutenant-Colonel Royal Engineers (T.A.), retired. Clerk to the Rural District Council of Warmley for over 20 years; Chairman of Executive, Rural District Councils Association for over 25 years

Diplomatic Service and Overseas List

Robert MacLeod Hodgson  His Majesty's Chargé d'Affaires at Moscow
Thomas Harold Lyle  His Majesty's Consul-General at Bangkok
Andrew Ryan  His Majesty's Consul-General at Rabat, Morocco

British India
John Arnold Wallinger  Indian Police

Colonies, Protectorates, etc.
Colonel Herbert Bryan  Colonial Secretary and Revenue Commissioner, Island of Jamaica
James Alexander Mackenzie Elder, Commissioner for the Commonwealth of Australia in the United States of America
James Crawford Maxwell  Colonial Secretary, Gold Coast Colony
Professor William Harrison Moore  Professor of Law, Melbourne University, Commonwealth of Australia
Major-General George Spafford Richardson  Administrator of Western Samoa

Commander of the Order of the British Empire (CBE)

Military Division
Royal Navy
Engineer Captain Cecil Henry Alec Bermingham  
Paymaster Captain Edgar Bocquet Swan  
Captain Courtenay Charles Evan, Baron Tredegar 

Army
Lieutenant-Colonel and Brevet Colonel Ernest Robinson  Tyne Electrical Engineers, Territorial Army
Major Francis David Alexander, Inspector of Remounts
Colonel William Henniker Anderson, Indian Army
Major and Brevet Lieutenant-Colonel Charles Reginald Barke  5th Battalion, The North Staffordshire Regiment, Territorial Army, Commanding 3rd Battalion, Iraq Levies
Colonel James Molesworth Blair  late Military Attache, Belgrade
Major and Brevet Lieutenant-Colonel Herbert Thomas Dobbin  The Duke of Cornwall's Light Infantry, Commandant, Iraq Levies
Colonel John Cavendish Freeland, Indian Army
Lieutenant-Colonel Claude Henry Haig  2nd Battalion, The Leicestershire Regiment
Florence May Hodgins  Matron-in-Chief, Queen Alexandra's Imperial Military Nursing Service
Lieutenant-Colonel George Elliot Llewhellin  Bihar Light Horse, Auxiliary Force, India
Lieutenant-Colonel William Hew McCowan  Regular Army Reserve of Officers, Cameron Highlanders, Officer Commanding Khartoum District
Colonel John Galloway Riddick  42nd Divisional Royal Engineers, Territorial Army

Royal Air Force
Wing Commander Augustine ap Ellis

Civil Division

Thomas Martland Ainscough  H.M. Senior Trade Commissioner in India and Ceylon
Lieutenant-Colonel the Hon. George Augustus Anson  Chief Constable of Staffordshire
Thomas James Arnold, Principal Private Secretary to Minister of Pensions
George Edwin Baker, Assistant Secretary, Mercantile Marine Department, Board of Trade
George Paddock Bate  For services to the Home Office under the Factory Acts
William Freshfield Burnett, Registrar, HM Land Registry
Francis Carnegie  Chief Mechanical Engineer and Superintendent, Building Works Department, Royal Arsenal
Lieutenant-Colonel John Fillis Carré Carter, Deputy Assistant Commissioner, Metropolitan Police 
David Mackay Cassidy  Medical Superintendent, Lancaster Mental Hospital
The Hon. Stephen Ogle Henn Collins, Legal Adviser to the Admiralty on War Compensation Cases
Essie Ruth Conway  Principal, Tiber Street Council School, Liverpool. Member of Consultative Committee of Board of Education
Commissioner Adelaide Cox, Commissioner in the Salvation Army
James William Curry  late Controller of Supplies, Office of Works
Colonel Ivor Curtis  Educational Adviser, Air Ministry
Mary Elizabeth Davies  Matron-in-chief, Ministry of Pensions, Nursing Service
William Augustus Bulkeley-Evans  For services to the Ministry of Labour
Samuel George Forsythe  Postmaster-Surveyor of Glasgow
Henry Genochio, Senior Deputy Chief Inspector, Board of Customs and Excise
Lieutenant Commander Oscar Henderson  (retired), Private Secretary to His Grace the Governor of Northern Ireland
Maxwell Hyslop Maxwell  Chairman of Watch Committee, Liverpool
Ernest Alfred John Pearce  Director of Warship Production, Royal Corps of Naval Constructors, Admiralty
Seward Pearce, Assistant Director of Public Prosecutions
Councillor Margaret Evelyn Pilkington  President of St. Helen's Women's Unionist Association, Member of St Helens Council. For political and public services.
Ellen Frances Hume Pinsent, Commissioner, Board of Control
Godfrey Rotter  Director of Explosives Research, War Office
William George Verdon Smith, Chairman of Bristol Local Employment Committee
John, Lord Wodehouse  For public services.
Andrew Nicholas Bonaparte-Wyse, Assistant Secretary, Ministry of Education, Northern Ireland
Francis Watson Young, formerly one of H.M. Inspectors of Schools in Scotland. For public services.

British India
Lieutenant-Colonel Alfred Beckett Minchin  late Agent to the Governor-General, Punjab States
Lieutenant-Colonel Charles Edward Bruce  Deputy Commissioner, Dera Ismail Khan, North-West Frontier Province
Duncan John Sloss, Principal, University College, Rangoon, Burma
Major Alexander James Hutchison Russell, Indian Medical Service, Director of Public Health, Madras

Diplomatic Service and Overseas List
Austen Alexander Rodney Boyce, Head of Survey Department, Sudan Government
Charles Edward Hardley Childers, His Majesty's Consul at Pittsburg
John Gadsby, Legal Adviser to His Majesty's Embassy at Tokyo
Lieutenant-Colonel George Douglas Gray, Doctor at His Majesty's Legation at Peking
Thomas Lavington Jacks, Joint Manager of the Anglo-Persian Oil Company
William Kidston McClure

Colonies, Protectorates, etc.
George Drysdale Bayley, Commissioner of Lands and Mines, Colony of British Guiana
Richard Hind Cambage, Honorary Secretary to the Australian National Research Council, Commonwealth of Australia
Massimiliano Debono  President of the Senate and President of the Chamber of Advocates, Island of Malta
Edgard Lucien de Chazal  Superintendent, Victoria Hospital, Mauritius
The Reverend Alexander Hetherwick  Head of the Church of Scotland Mission, Nyasaland Protectorate, and Member of the Legislative Council of the Protectorate
John Lisseter Humphreys, British Adviser, Trengganu, Malay States
David Sliman MacGregor, Treasurer and Custodian of Enemy Property, Nigeria
Colonel Angus John McNeill  Commandant, British Section, Palestine Gendarmerie
Clive McPherson, has acted as Honorary Adviser to the Government of the Commonwealth of Australia in the organization of primary industries
John Pears Murray, Deputy Resident Commissioner, Basutoland
Victor Richard Ratten  Surgeon Superintendent, Hobart Public Hospital, State of Tasmania
Frank Arthur Stockdale, Director of Agriculture, Ceylon
Allan Wilkie, Actor-Manager and producer of Shakespeare's Plays in the Commonwealth of Australia

Honorary Commanders
Haji Nik Mahmud bin Haji Ismail, the Datok Perdana Meaitri Paduka Raja of Kelantan, Malay States
Plaji Ngah Muhammad bin Yusuf, Datok Sri Amar Diraja, President of the State Council, Trengganu, Malay States

Officer of the Order of the British Empire (OBE)

Military Division
Royal Navy
Commander Edward Bernard Cornish Dicken 
Commander Robert Lindsay Burnett  
Surgeon Commander John Scarbrough Dudding  
Paymaster Commander Robert Alfred Jinkin  Instructor
Lieutenant-Commander Arthur Edward Hall 
Major Frederick William Mattison 

Army
Temp. Inspector of Works and Captain William Barrie  Staff for Royal Engineer Services
Major Darell St. John Baxter, 3/8th Punjab Regiment, Indian Army
Lieutenant-Colonel Gerald Beach  9th Battalion, The Middlesex Regiment, Territorial Army
Major and Brevet Lieutenant-Colonel Maxwell Spieker Brander  Royal Army Service Corps
Major and Brevet Lieutenant-Colonel Richard Bolger Butler  8th King George's Own Light Cavalry, Indian Army
Lieutenant-Colonel Joseph Coates, Oudh and Rohilkhand Railway Battalion, Auxiliary Force, India
Major Thomas Herbert Darwell  Royal Tank Corps
Lieutenant-Colonel The Hon. John Dewar  6/7th Battalion, The Black Watch, Territorial Army
Major George Melville Duncan  8th Battalion, The Argyll and Sutherland Highlanders, Territorial Army
Lieutenant-Colonel Frank Ninum Falkner  56th (1st London) Divisional Train, Royal Army Service Corps, Territorial Army
Major D'Arcy John Francis, 23rd (London) Armoured Car Company, Territorial Army
Lieutenant (Temp. Major) Ernest Edward Gawthorn  Postal Section, Royal Engineers
Major Cecil Courtney Godwin, The Green Howards
Major Harold James Huxford, 5th/6th Rajputana Rifles (Napiers), Indian Army
Captain Charles Norman Jervelund, The Green Howards
Major Edgar Montague Jones  St. Alban's School Contingent, Officers Training Corps, General List, Territorial Army. Ordnance Executive Officer, 1st Class, and Major John Henry Keyes  Royal Army Ordnance Corps
Staff Paymaster and Lieutenant-Colonel William Shand Mackenzie, Royal Army Pay Corps
Major Thomas Moss, 16th Punjab Regiment, Indian Army
Major and Brevet Lieutenant-Colonel David Ogilvy  Royal Engineers
Accountant Officer, 2nd Class, and Lieutenant-Colonel Vernon Ivor Robins, Corps of Military Accountants
Quartermaster and Major Albert Edward Robinson  Senior Officers School, Sheerness
Major John Scott  Indian Medical Service
Captain John Teague  1st/10th Baluch Regiment, Indian Army
Quartermaster and Major Jabez Teece  1st Battalion, Grenadier Guards
Quartermaster and Lieutenant-Colonel Frederick Walker, Recruiting Duties, Edinburgh
Major James Walker  26th (East Riding of Yorkshire) Armoured Car Company, Territorial Army
Major John Percival Ward  2nd, (Cheshire) Field Squadron, Royal Engineers, Territorial Army
Senior Nursing Sister Mary Wardell  Queen Alexandra's Military Nursing Service for India
Quartermaster and Major Frederick Henry White  Recruiting Duties, Wolverhampton

Royal Air Force
Squadron Leader Norman Channing Spratt 
Flight Lieutenant Albert William Fletcher 
Flight Lieutenant Norman Hugh Jenkins

Civil Division

Walter Abbott, Principal Officer, Ministry of Commerce, Northern Ireland
Albert Edward Adcock, Chairman of Deptford Local Employment Committee
William Anderson, Chief Constable, City of Aberdeen Police Force
Lieutenant-Colonel Sydney Ashley  Superintendent Registrar, St. Giles District
Councillor Henrietta Bartleet  Member of Birmingham City Council. For public services.
James Billings, Chief Constable, Metropolitan Police
James Gressier Blackledge  Chairman of Bootle Advisory Committee since 1918
John Joseph Bonnett, Chairman, South Middlesex, Slough and District War Pensions Committee
Arthur Brandram, Secretary, United Services Trustee
Captain John Turner Brinkley, Chief Constable of Warwickshire
William Allison Davies, Borough Treasurer of Preston. For valuable services in the work of Local Government
Frederic William Charles Dean  Superintendent, Royal Gun and Carriage Factories, Woolwich Arsenal
George Elmhirst Duckering, Inspector of Factories, Home Office. Director of Government Wool Disinfecting Station
Charles John Ffoulkes, Curator of Armouries, H.M. Tower of London, Curator and Secretary, Imperial War Museum
Joseph Wilson Fogarty  Temporary Assistant in Shipping Liquidation Department
Frederick William Prosser French, Principal Clerk, Board of Inland Revenue
Major Cedrio Valentine Godfrey, Chief Constable of Salford
Herbert Noah Grundy, Chief Instructions Officer, Employment and Insurance Department, Ministry of Labour
Ivor Blashka Hart  Education Officer, Grade I, Air Ministry
Henry Cleverdon Honey, Director of Gas Administration, Board of Trade
Albert Humphries  Superintendent, Royal Ammunition Factories, Royal Arsenal
William Aubrey Hurst For services to the Ministry of Labour
David Sinclair Irvine, Chairman of Londonderry Local Employment Committee
The Reverend Canon Thomas Jesse Jones  Chairman of Bargoed Local Employment Committee
Edwin Charles Jubb, Assistant Director of Navy Contracts, Admiralty
Zachary Harris Kingdon, Superintending Electrical Engineer, Grade I., Devonport Dockyard
Neil McLennan, Chief Constable, Dumbarton County Force
William Macleod, Senior Inspector of Taxes, Board of Inland Revenue
William James Mair, Chairman of Luton Local Employment Committee
Cecil Charles Hudson Moriarty, Assistant Chief Constable of Birmingham
Captain Joseph Dallas Nicholl  Ulster Special Constabulary
The Reverend Harry Pearson  Hon C.F., Secretary of London Police Court Mission since 1915
Herbert Richard Poole  Deputy Accountant General, Board of Customs and Excise
Edwin Potts. For valuable services in connection with National Health Insurance
Lieutenant-Colonel Cecil du Pré Penton Powney  Commandant, Metropolitan Special Constabulary
William Alfred Radley, Technical Adviser, Small Arms Ammunition, Royal Arsenal
George Randell-Evans, Chairman, St. Pancras and Hampstead War Pensions Committee
Charles John Ritchie  Senior Staff Officer, Metropolitan Special Constabulary
Arthur Francis Rowe, Chief Clerk in the Department of the Director of Public Prosecutions
Arthur William Rowe  Senior Principal Clerk, Ministry of Pensions
Mark Scott  Chairman of Selby Local Employment Committee
Roland Ingleby Smith  Deputy Director of Works and Chief Architect, Ministry of Finance, Northern Ireland
James Don Stewart, Deputy Director of Accounts, Ministry of Pensions
James Stirling, Registrar of Births, Deaths and Marriages for Anderston Registration District, Glasgow
Charles Terry  Chairman of Redditch Local Employment Committee
Lieutenant-Colonel Charles Joseph Wiley  Chief Insurance Officer, Ministry of Labour
Bruce Murray Wylie, late Assistant Accountant-General, General Post Office

Diplomatic Service and Overseas List
Cooke Adams
Robert Edward Hartwell Baily  Governor of Khartoum
Captain Rudolph Hollocombe, Translator to His Majesty's Legation at Mexico
Gilbert Walter King, Registrar of Supreme Court for China and Korea
Francis Joseph Patron, His Majesty's Consul at Palermo
Julian Piggott, Rhineland High Commission
Johannes Marius Prillevitz, His Majesty's Consul at The Hague
Zoe Tristram
Ernest Troughton, Rhineland High Commission
Ebenezar Thomas Ward
Lieutenant-Colonel John James Whitehead, British Vice-Consul at Lemberg

British India
George Connor, Divisional and Sessions Judge, Peshawar, North-West Frontier Province
Alexander John Happell, Deputy Commissioner of Police, Madras
Khan Bahadur Sheik Abdul Aziz, Superintendent of Police, Punjab
Reginald Bramley Van Wart, Principal of the Rajput Schools, Jodhpur, Rajputana
Edwin Somerville Murray, Manager of the Aden firm of Messrs. Luke Thomas & Co., Bombay
Ernest Edwin Coombs, Superintendent, Government Printing and Stationery, Bombay
Ronald Wordsworth Fleming Shaw, late Registrar, Patna University, Bihar and Orissa
Frank Wood, Managing Director, Messrs. Foucar & Co., Burma
Janaki Nath Mukerji, Chief Electrician, Posts and Telegraphs Department
Jeanie Morrison Gibb, St. John's Ambulance Association, Bengal
Helen Gordon Stuart, Chief Inspectress of Girls Schools, United Provinces
Thomas George Cuyper, retired Builder and Contractor, Bengal

Colonies, Protectorates, etc.
William Bevan, lately Director of Agriculture, Colony of Cyprus
Charles William Joseph Bird, Secretary, to the City Council, Gibraltar
James Marie Brodie, Nominated Member of the Council of Government, Mauritius
James Edward Francis Campbell, Assistant District Governor, Jerusalem-Jaffa District, Palestine
William Henry Chase, Principal Veterinary Officer, Bechuanaland Protectorate
Morley Thomas Dawe, Commissioner of Lands and Forests, Sierra Leone
Cecil John Edmonds, Administrative Inspector, Kirkuk Liwa, Ministry of the Interior, Iraq
William Alexander Elder, Principal Veterinary Officer, Swaziland
Captain Ofcho Lewis Hancock, Commissioner of the Virgin Islands
Edmund Wodehouse Lucie-Smith, Manager of the Colonial Bank in Jamaica, for services to the Government of Jamaica
Allan Graham, Marwick, Assistant Commissioner, Hlatikulu District, Swaziland
Rupert Otway, Inspector of Works and Roads, Montserrat
Major Herbert Walter Peebles  Commissioner of Montserrat
Arthur Elliott Goodchild Terry, Valuer, First Class, Board of Inland Revenue; for services as one of the Joint Secretaries, Compensation (Ireland) Commission
Frank Arthur Verney, Principal Veterinary Officer, Basutoland
Frederick Henry Watkins  Magistrate of Nevis

Honorary Officers
All Effendi Jarallah  Member of the Supreme Court of Palestine
Ruhi Bey Abdel Hadi, District Officer, Jerusalem-Jaffa District, Palestine
Abder Rahman Effendi El Haj, Mayor of Haifa, Palestine

Member of the Order of the British Empire (MBE)

Military Division
Army
Sub-Conductor Lancelot John Addison, Indian Army Service Corps
Quartermaster and Captain Howard Armishaw, 5th Battalion, The Royal Warwickshire Regiment, Territorial Army
Lieutenant Philip Taylor Baddiley, Regular Army Reserve of Officers, General List, 3rd Battalion, Iraq Levies
Assistant Commissary and Lieutenant Charles Gordon Bartrop, Indian Miscellaneous List
Captain Frank Melville Moyle Bawden, 4th/5th Battalion, The Duke of Cornwall's Light Infantry, Territorial Army
Regimental Sergeant-Major William Black, Royal Engineers
Captain William Maurice Broomhall, Royal Engineers
Quartermaster and Lieutenant Walter John Cook  1st Battalion, Coldstream Guards
Staff Sergeant-Major Frederick James Coplin, Royal Army Service Corps
Captain Harry Dawkins, Royal Engineers, Indian Army
Captain George Thomas Dorrell  90th (1st London) Field Brigade, Royal Artillery, Territorial Army
Lieutenant William George Ide Miers Etherington, Army Educational Corps
Captain Richard Maurice Foskett, Indian Army Service Corps
First-Class Staff Sergeant-Major William James Franks, Royal Army Service Corps
Captain William Henry Godfrey  13th Battalion, The London Regiment, Territorial Army
Lieutenant Cyril Harvey Gowan  13th/18th Hussars, Cavalry Instructor, Iraq Army
Captain James Grassie  Record Office, Perth
Sub-Conductor George Sydney Griffin, Indian Army Service Corps
Lieutenant Francis William Hall, Regular Army Reserve of Officers
General List, Ordnance Officer, Iraq Levies
Captain Frank Albert Hilbom  Royal Tank Corps
Temp. Lieutenant Harold Douglas Hill, General List
Quartermaster and Captain Daniel Hutton, Royal Engineer's
Assistant Commissary and Lieutenant Charles Gowan Jackson, Indian Miscellaneous List
Quartermaster and Captain Thomas Manfield
4th Battalion, The Royal Welsh Fusiliers, Territorial Army
Captain Frederick Mattocks, Royal Engineers, Indian Army
Ordnance Officer, 4th Class, and Captain John Stuart Omond  Royal Army Ordnance Corps
Captain Charles Edward Ovington  5th City of London Regiment (London Rifle Brigade), Territorial Army
Quartermaster and Lieutenant James Radford, 2nd Battalion, The Devonshire Regiment
Lieutenant James Malcolm Leslie Renton, The Rifle Brigade, Deputy-Assistant Adjutant General, Iraq Levies
Sub-Conductor Benjamin Rigby, Indian Miscellaneous List
Quartermaster and Lieutenant George Frederick William Smith  The Queen's Bays (2nd Dragoon Guards)
Assistant Commissary and Lieutenant Walter Smith, Indian, Miscellaneous List
Captain Eneas Symonds, 3rd/19th Hyderabad Regiment, Indian Army
Quartermaster and Lieutenant Thomas Stephen Tate  1st Battalion, Soote Guards
Quartermaster and Captain Harry William Thomas Vine, Royal Army Service Corps
Quartermaster and Lieutenant Robert Henderson White, 6th Battalion, The Seaforth Highlanders, Territorial Army
Subadar Major Barkat Ram Bahadur, Indian Medical Department

Royal Air Force
Flying Officer Ernest Stanford Bullen
Flying Officer Edwin James Newman 
Sergeant-Major 1st Class, Albert Edward Harbot 
Sergeant-Major 2nd Class, Reuben Charles Pennicott

Civil Division

Frederick Copping Allworth, Staff Clerk, Ministry of Health
John Hernaman Boulton, Chief Superintendent, Birmingham Police
William Bradley, Senior. Costings Investigator, Army Contracts Directorate, War Office
William Reginald Busbridge, Station-Master at Dover
William Arthur Carson  Assistant Accountant, Ministry of Finance, Northern Ireland
Frank Randall Coles, Clerk to the Hackney Board of Guardians
Charles Stockley Collins, Superintendent, Metropolitan Police
William Arthur Dalley, Manager, Birmingham Employment Exchange
Frederick Darlington, late Headmaster of the Dockyard School, Devonport
Herbert Davey, Secretary of the Association of Poor Law Unions
Thomas Davies, Staff Officer, Chief Inspector's Office, Inland Revenue
Joseph William Dobie, Accountant, Board of Customs and Excise
William Donaldson, Waterguard Superintendent, 1st Class, Board of Customs and Excise
Stanley Walter Dowden, Clerk, Higher Clerical Class, H.M. Land Registry
Joseph Dryden, Superintendent, Durham County Police
James Thomson Edwards, Manager, Edinburgh Employment Exchange, Ministry of Labour
Edward James Fair, Manager, Tavistock Street, Employment Exchange, London
Mary Caroline Eraser, Voluntary worker among soldiers and their dependants for 30 years
William James Gibbs, Steward at Tooting Bee Asylum under Metropolitan Asylums Board
William Cecil Glover, Higher Executive Officer, Ministry of Agriculture, Northern Ireland
William Egerton Glover, Chief Superintendent, Liverpool Police
Robert Frederick Goldsack, Member of Plymouth and District War Pensions Committee
James MeDougall Graham, Manager, Govan Employment Exchange
Richard John Halford, Superintendent, London City Police
William Smith Hankins, Commandant, Metropolitan Special Constabulary Reserve
Jane Ellen Leslie Harrison, Member of Stoke-on-Trent, Cheadle and District War Pensions Committee
Samuel William Francis Hart, Surveyor, Board of Customs and Excise
Thomas Hickman, Clerk of the Chamber and Messenger of the Great Seal, House of Lords
Alfred House, Staff Officer, Companies Department, Board of Trade
John Ireland, Senior Superintendent, Mercantile Marine Office, Bristol, Board of Trade
John Ivin, Deputy Chief Constable, Bedfordshire Police
James Alister Kirkpatrick, Assistant Accountant, Ministry of Home Affairs, Northern Ireland
Margaret Katharine Lea, Woman Inspector, Ministry of Health
Livsey Lees, Manager, Oldham Employment Exchange
Bertram Ralph Leftwich, Librarian, Board of Customs and Excise
Hugh Coffey Love, Superintending Officer, Ministry of Education, Northern Ireland
Alexander Marr, Chief Constable, Montrose Burgh Police Force
Walter Marshall, Mate Higher Clerical Officer, Board of Trade
Henry John Martin, Superintendent, Metropolitan Police
Alfred Bertram Melles, Horticultural Officer, France, Imperial War Graves Commission
George Monro, Commandant, Metropolitan Special Constabulary
John Morrison, Assistant Chief Constable, Lanark County Police Force
John Burton Newman, Education Officer, Grade II., Air Ministry
John Newson. Senior Staff Officer, Statistical Office, Board of Customs and Excise
Elizabeth Claudia Owen, Chief Woman Officer, Wales Division, Ministry of Labour
Charles William Palmer, Clerk (Higher Grade), Inland Revenue
William Pinder, Ulster Special Constabulary
Henry Gratton Pring, District Commandant, Ulster Special Constabulary
Gerard John Rawes, Staff Officer, Chief Inspector's Office, Inland Revenue
Captain Samuel Ray, Auditor, Sinai Military Railway
Henry Ernest Redfern, Superintendent, West Riding County Police
George Rowley Richardson, Statistical Officer, Air Ministry
Alice Rosa Ridgeway, Chief Woman Officer, N.E. Division, Ministry of Labour
Ellen Phipps Robinson, Honorary Secretary of Northampton Cripple Children's Fund
David Rock  District Commandant, Ulster Special Constabulary
Colonel Henry Charles Savage, Commandant, Metropolitan Special Constabulary
Alfred William Scarlett, Waterguard Superintendent 1st Class, Board of Customs and Excise
Harry Shires, Civil Engineer, Works and Buildings Department, Air Ministry
Olive Story, Member of Finsbury, Holborn and City of London War Pensions Committee
Caroline Swindells, Senior Chief Superintendent of Typists, Board of Inland Revenue
Robert Henry Todd, District Commandant, Ulster Special Constabulary
Ernest Arthur Train, Manager, Employment Exchange, Hull
Charles Walker, Superintendent, Derbyshire Police
Lucy Withrington, Lady Superintendent, Pension Issue Office
Herbert Woodmore, Superintendent, Metropolitan Police

Diplomatic Service and Overseas List

Lazarus Sarkies Arathoon, His Majesty's Vice-Consul at Macassar
George Davis Baker, Archivist at His Majesty's Embassy at Washington
Frances M. Coleridge, His Majesty's Embassy, Berlin, Germany
James Dalton, His Majesty's Vice-Consul at Samarang
Samuel Evans, Head Clerk of the Intelligence Section of the Sudan Agency in Cairo
Egerton Shaw Humber, His Majesty's Vice-Consul at Panama
Eve B. Napier, Head of the Commercial Registry, His Majesty's Embassy at Washington
Frank Pattman, Cypher Officer at the Residency, Cairo

British India
M. E. Ry. Bao Bahadur Abhiramapuram Krishnamoorthi Sastrigal Rajah Ayyar Avargal, Superintendent of Police, Madras
George Edward Johnston, Deputy Commissioner, Excise Department, Madras
Herbert John Bomer, Deputy Transportation Superintendent, Great Indian Peninsula Railway, Bombay
Agnes Dorothea Haskell, St. John's Ambulance Nursing Division, Bengal
Major Henry Mansfield, Deputy Superintendent, Campbell Medical School and Hospital, Calcutta
Helen Stubbs, Fyzabad, United Provinces
Harry Lamacraft, Deputy Superintendent of Police, Hissar, Punjab
Chan Ta Hin, Merchant and Contractor, Burma
Mohamed Ayoob, alias U Shwe Yun, Pleader, Government Prosecutor, Mergui, Burma
Saravaiya Amritaraj, Health Officer, Civil and Military Station, Bangalore, Mysore
George Prior de la Hey, Personal Assistant to the Military Secretary to His Excellency the Viceroy
Epiphanio Mariano Sequeira, Treasury Officer, Bushire Residency, Persian Gulf
Lieutenant James Charlemagne Chalke, Indian Medical Department, Assistant Surgeon to His Excellency the Governor
Henry Martin, Head Clerk, British Trade Agency, Gyantse, Tibet
William Thomas Ottewill, Parliamentary Clerk, India Office, Assistant Secretary to the Fourth and Fifth Assemblies of the League of Nations

Colonies, Protectorates, etc.
Samuel Patrick Bland, Assistant Director of Public Works, Zanzibar
Annie Isabel Brizzell, Matron, Maseru Hospital, Basutoland Nursing Service
Lawrence de Martino For services to the Malta Association in London
Giuseppe Despott, Superintendent of Fisheries, Island of Malta
Ludovic Smith Hohenkerk, Superintendent of Forest Surveys, British Guiana
Edward Robert Mifsud, Clerk to the Executive Council and Clerk to the Nominated Council, Island of Malta
Alexander Walker Money, Second Class Valuer, Valuation Department, Inland Revenue (Scotland); for services as Investigator, Compensation (Ireland) Commission
Nicholas Wilfrid Morgappah, Assistant Registrar-General, Registrar-General's Department, Ceylon
Frank Sands, of Singapore, Commissioner for Malaya of the Boy Scouts Association
Ernest Goldfinch Seagoe, Commandant of the British Division, New Hebrides Constabulary
John Howard Sempill, Chief of Police and Provost Marshal General, Bermuda
Glencora Barnes Schneider, of Colombo, Ceylon. In recognition of her public services.
Thomas Walter White, Assistant, Post and Telegraph Department, Ceylon
Margaret Isabel Willdon, Matron, Leper Settlement, Botsabelo, Basutoland

Honorary Members
Ibrahim Bey Habeish Stambuli, Assistant Commandant of Police, Jerusalem
Qustandi Effendi Qanaze, Headmaster, Government Secondary Boys School, Nazareth, Palestine
Mikhayel Mani, Member of the District Court of Jaffa, Palestine
Ho Siak Kuan, Assistant Secretary for Chinese Affairs, Straits Settlements

Kaisar-i-Hind Medal
First Class
The Hon. Florence Mary Macnaghten, in charge Canadian Mission, Kangra, Punjab
Winifred Spicer, Lady Superintendent
Lady Minto's Indian Nursing Association, and Matron of the Railway Hospital, Ajmer, Rajputana
The Reverend Lorrain Barber, Missionary, Faridpur Industrial School, Bengal
The Reverend Cæsar Augustus Rodney Janvier  American Presbyterian Mission, Principal, Ewing Christian College, Allahabad, United Provinces
Esther Gimson Bare 
Clara Swain Methodist, Episcopal Mission Hospital, Bareilly, United Provinces
Dorothy Cisley de la Hey, Principal, Queen Mary's College for Women, Madras
Mother Henrietta, in charge of the Nurses at the Ranchi Sadar Hospital, Bihar and Orissa
Edith, Louisa Young  Palwal Mission Dispensary, Gurgaon District, Punjab

British Empire Medal (BEM)

Military Division 
For Gallantry
James Burke. In recognition of his action in stopping runaway horses on two occasions at great personal risk.

For Meritorious Service
Riza Chaqir, Cavass employed at H.M. Legation, Durazzo
John Gould, Head Constable, Royal Ulster Constabulary
Sergeant Hector Gray, Park-keeper at Holyrood Park
John Hayes, Head Constable, Royal Ulster Constabulary
Ibrahim Kiatovic, Head Cavass at H.M. Embassy Constantinople
Bertie Wallace Tibbie. For public services in saving life.

Air Force Cross (AFC)

Flight Lieutenant Richard Burnard Munday 
Flight Lieutenant William Edmund Somervell

Air Force Medal (AFM)

Sergeant (Pilot) Alfred Percy Reeve

Imperial Service Order (ISO)
Home Civil Service

William L. Calderwood  Inspector of Salmon Fisheries for Scotland
William Thomas Chard, Inspector of Rates, Rating of Government Property Department
Arthur Harold Wyld Cleave  Deputy Master, Royal Mint, Ottawa, Canada
Edward William Colvill, Principal Ship Surveyor, Board of Trade
William Donaldson, Waterguard Superintendent, H.M. Customs and Excise
Montague Spencer Guiseppi, Superintendent of Legal Literary Research Booms, Public Record Office
Joseph Johnston, First Class Clerk, Central Office, Supreme Court of Judicature
Robert McIlroy, Superintending Engineer, London Engineering District, General Post Office
Arthur James Pearce, Staff Officer, Board of Control
James Ridley Redhead, Principal Clerk, Estate Duty Office, Board of Inland Revenue

Colonial Civil Service
William James Clemens, Secretary and Chief Inspector of the Public Service Board, Commonwealth of Australia
Henry Edmonds Downie, Commissioner of Taxes, State of Tasmania
Thomas James Greenwood, Commissioner, First Grade, Colony of Cyprus
Eugene Patrick Griffin  Chief Assistant Secretary, Office of Colonial Secretary, Gibraltar
Walter Belinfante Isaacs, lately Supervisor, Revenue Department, Island Treasurer and Manager of the Government Savings Bank, Jamaica
William Miller, Surveyor-General, Bahama Islands
Charles Rodway Morrison, Office Assistant to the Provincial Commissioner of the Southern Province, Sierra Leone
Charles Adrien Pollonais, Assistant Treasurer, Colony of Trinidad and Tobago
Bertram Tanner, Headmaster, Queen's College, Hong Kong
Edgar Allen Garvin Vanderstraaten, Third Landing Surveyor, Customs Department, Ceylon

Indian Civil Service
Hugh Bainbridge Bendle, Assistant Commissioner, Excise Department, and Secretary to the Commissioner of Excise, Madras
Khan Bahadur Fardunji Mancherji Dastur, Registrar of the University of Bombay
Andrew Frank Emmer, Assistant Secretary to Resident and Treasury Officer, Hyderabad (Deccan)
Raj Bahadur Sardar Tirath Singh, Deputy Superintendent of Police, United Provinces
Thomas Stephens Farmer, Superintendent, Reformatory School, Delhi
Gerson de Luna, Superintendent, Residency Office, Aden
Sheikh Imam-ud-Dm, Inspector of Police and Head Clerk, Office of Senior Superintendent of Police, Lahore, Punjab

Imperial Service Medal (ISM)

Abdul Kadir, late Daftri, Government of India, Foreign and Political Department
Harakh Bam, late Jemadar chaprasi, Deputy Commissioner's Office, Banchi, Bihar and Orissa

References

Birthday Honours
1925 awards
1925 in Australia
1925 in India
1925 in New Zealand
1925 in the United Kingdom